Etiocholanolone, also known as 5β-androsterone, as well as 3α-hydroxy-5β-androstan-17-one or etiocholan-3α-ol-17-one, is an etiocholane (5β-androstane) steroid as well as an endogenous 17-ketosteroid that is produced from the metabolism of testosterone. It causes fever, immunostimulation, and leukocytosis, and is used to evaluate adrenal cortex function, bone marrow performance, and in neoplastic disease to stimulate the immune system. Etiocholanolone is also known to be an inhibitory androstane neurosteroid, acting as a positive allosteric modulator of the GABAA receptor, and possesses anticonvulsant effects. The unnatural enantiomer of etiocholanolone is more potent as a positive allosteric modulator of GABAA receptors and as an anticonvulsant than the natural form.

Etiocholanolone has been studied as a pyrogenic steroid in the so-called steroid fever (or etiocholanolone fever), a condiditon similar to familial mediterranean fever (FMF). Etiocholanolone (like pregnanolone) activates the pyrin inflammasome. It is not known whether these endogenous steroids play a role in triggering FMF flares but they may make a link between stress, menstrual cycle and disease flares.

Etiocholanolone is produced from 5β-dihydrotestosterone, with 3α,5β-androstanediol as an intermediate.

Chemistry

See also
 Androsterone
 Epiandrosterone
 Epietiocholanolone
 Etiocholanolone glucuronide

References

Etiocholanes
Neurosteroids
GABAA receptor positive allosteric modulators
Human metabolites
World Anti-Doping Agency prohibited substances